General MIDI Level 2 or GM2 is a specification for synthesizers which defines several requirements beyond the more abstract MIDI standard and is based on General MIDI and GS extensions. It was adopted in 1999 by the MIDI Manufacturers Association (MMA).

General requirements 
 Number of Notes: 32 simultaneous notes
 MIDI Channels: 16
 Simultaneous Melodic Instruments – up to 16 (all Channels)
 Simultaneous Percussion Kits – up to 2 (Channel 10/11)

Parameters

Program and bank change events
General MIDI 2 compatible synthesizers access all of the 256 instruments by setting cc#0 (Bank Select MSB) to 121 and using cc#32 (Bank Select LSB) to select the variation bank before a Program Change. Variation bank 0 contains the full GM — that is, General MIDI 1 — sound set. Variations using other bank numbers are new to General MIDI 2, and correspond to variation sounds introduced in Roland GS.

Melodic sounds

Piano

Chromatic Percussion

Organ

Guitar

Bass

Orchestra Solo

Orchestra Ensemble

Brass

Reed

Wind

Synth Lead

Synth Pad

Synth Sound FX

Ethnic

Percussive

Sound Effect

Drum sounds 
These are the same patch numbers as defined in the original version of GS. Drum bank is accessed by setting cc#0 (Bank Select MSB) to 120 and cc#32 (Bank Select LSB) to 0 and PC (Program Change) to select drum kit.

Additional percussion notes 
These are the same GS drum notes and span Drum Kits 1 to 49:

Supported Control Change messages

Supported Registered Parameter Numbers (RPNs)
 Pitch Bend Sensitivity
 Channel Fine Tune
 Channel Coarse Tune
 Modulation Depth Range (Vibrato Depth Range)
 Velocity

Supported Universal System Exclusive (SysEx) messages
 Master Volume
 Master Fine Tuning
 Master Coarse Tuning
 Reverb Type
 Reverb Time
 Chorus Type
 Chorus Mod Rate
 Chorus Mod Depth
 Chorus Feedback
 Chorus Send to Reverb
 Controller Destination Setting
 Scale/Octave Tuning Adjust
 Key-Based Instrument Controllers
 GM2 System On

See also
 Comparison of MIDI standards

References

External links
 MIDI Manufacturers Association (MMA)
 

MIDI standards
Computer-related introductions in 1999